Terrence P. Dunn is an American business executive. He is known as the President and Chief Executive Officer of J.E. Dunn Construction Company, a position he has held since 1989. He is also affiliated with UMB Financial Corporation and Kansas City Southern. He is a member of the National Executive Board of the Boy Scouts of America and former chairman of the Federal Reserve Bank of Kansas City.

References

National Executive Board of the Boy Scouts of America members
Living people
Year of birth missing (living people)